Ivan Arčanin (16 October 1906 – 27 April 1995) was a Yugoslav swimmer. He competed in the men's 4 × 200 metre freestyle relay event at the 1924 Summer Olympics.

References

External links
 

1906 births
1995 deaths
Yugoslav male swimmers
Olympic swimmers of Yugoslavia
Swimmers at the 1924 Summer Olympics
Place of birth missing